The 2016 1. deild was the seventy-third season of second-tier football on the Faroe Islands.

Leif Niclasen scored 36 goals, breaking the goalscoring record in a single season, set by Brian Jacobsen in the previous year.

League table

Top goalscorers

See also
2016 Faroe Islands Premier League
2016 Faroe Islands Cup

References

1. deild seasons
2016 in Faroe Islands football
1. deild
Faroe
Faroe